Marjan Jugović (born 26 August 1983) is a Serbian footballer.

Career

Napredak 
Born in Kruševac, Jugović started his career in Serbia at FK Napredak Kruševac.He played with Napredak until 2006. Except for the 2003–04 season when he played with Napredak in the First League of Serbia and Montenegro after becoming the champions of the second league the season before, he played all the seasons in the Second League. In summer 2006 he joined FK Željezničar Sarajevo spending one and half season with them in the Bosnian Premier League.

Poland
On 27 August 2008, Jugović signed a contract for Wisła Płock.  In early 2009 he transferred to Polonia Bytom having played in the Ekstraklasa. Jugović stayed there for a short time, because the club was declared bankrupt.

Zeta
During 2010 Jugović played with FK Zeta in the Montenegrin First League.  He played with them in their qualifying matches for the UEFA Europa League that season.

Syria
In early 2011 signed a four-year contract with Al-Ittihad Aleppo playing with them the qualification for the Asian Champions League against Al Sadd SC of Qatar, but they lost the match 5–1. They continued to compete in AFC Cup. After only four months in Syria, he was forced to leave Syria because of the Syrian civil war.

On 1 October 2011, signed a one-year contract with Busaiteen Club from Bahrain.

Iceland
In March 2013 he joined Icelandic Premier club Keflavík FC.
He scored in his debut against Fimleikafélag Hafnarfjarðar (FH) on 6 May 2013.

Indonesia 
On December 20, 2014, he signed with Indonesia Super League club Barito Putera.

Lebanon 
When the Indonesian league was suspended by FIFA, Jugovic signed a contract with Al-Akhaa Al-Ahli Aley from Beirut (Lebanon). Their Syrian coach, Afash, made a good and very strong team, with good local players, and also with a few foreign players. The team finished the season in 4th position.

India
In February 2017, Jugovic was signed by I-League champions Bengaluru FC.
He won the Federation Cup when BFC beat Mohun Bagan AC in the final.

Honours 
Napredak
Winner
 Silver medal Cup Yugoslavia:  2001–2002
 Cup Bosnia and Herzegovina: 2007–08
 Cup Syria: 2010–11
 Silver medal Kings Cup Bahrain: 2011–12

References

External links 
 AFC 

Living people
1983 births
Sportspeople from Kruševac
Association football forwards
Serbian footballers
FK Napredak Kruševac players
FK Mladost Lučani players
FK Željezničar Sarajevo players
FK Zeta players
Wisła Płock players
Polonia Bytom players
Ekstraklasa players
Expatriate footballers in Poland
Al-Ittihad Aleppo players
Expatriate footballers in Syria
Expatriate footballers in Qatar
Knattspyrnudeild Keflavík players
FK Sloga Kraljevo players
Expatriate footballers in Iceland
NK Zvijezda Gradačac players
Expatriate footballers in Bosnia and Herzegovina
PS Barito Putera players
Liga 1 (Indonesia) players
Serbian expatriate footballers
Expatriate footballers in Indonesia
Serbian expatriate sportspeople in Indonesia
Bengaluru FC players
Syrian Premier League players
Serbian expatriate sportspeople in Lebanon
Expatriate footballers in Lebanon
Akhaa Ahli Aley FC players
Lebanese Premier League players